Flag carrier may refer to:

 Standard-bearer, a person (soldier or civilian) who bears an emblem called an ensign or standard
 A person carrying a heraldic standard or flag, usually at sporting events and parades, previously on the battlefield

 Flag carrier, transportation company, such as a shipping or airline company, that is registered in a given state
 A strong supporter of a cause, or perhaps the strongest, most visible and most vocal supporter of said cause. Example: "Bill was the flag carrier of the movement to improve inner city education."

See also
 USS Flagg carrier (toy aircraft carrier)